Soviet-occupied Estonia may refer to:
 Estonian Soviet Socialist Republic
 Soviet occupation of the Baltic states (1940), including Estonia
 Soviet re-occupation of the Baltic states (1944), including Estonia

See also 
 Baltic states under Soviet rule (1944–1991)
 German occupation of the Baltic states during World War II
 German occupation of Estonia during World War II
 Occupation of Estonia by Nazi Germany
 Occupation of the Baltic states
 Vabamu Museum of Occupations and Freedom